Films and Frames Digital Film Awards, popularly known as FAFDA are awards to reward artistic and technical merit in the Bengali Film Industry. The concept of a regional digital awards was conceived during the COVID-19 pandemic which began during the summer of 2020, forcing both artists and audiences into isolation, hence the entire award show was shot indoors by either the artists themselves or by the FAFDA crew.

History 
Films and Frames Digital Film Awards started off with the Chinese social media platform Helo from the house of ByteDance Ltd as its title partner and the award show was subsequently re-branded to Helo Films and Frames Digital Film Awards. Since the mid of June 2020 however, tensions started escalating between India and China at the border between the two nations. Under section 69A of the information technology act, the Indian Ministry of Information Technology identified 54 Chinese apps, Helo being one of them which threatened the ‘sovereignty’ of India. Following this development, Films and Frames with immediate effect terminated its partnership with Helo. On the 12th of June 2020, actress Srabanti Chatterjee launched the logo of FAFDA 2020. To make the content social media appropriate and viewable on a smartphone, for the first time an entire award show was shot in a vertical 9:16 format and aired as episodic content, over a period of 10 days. The first episode premiered on the 10th of July 2020 on Facebook Watch.

Awards 
Viewer's choice

 Best Film
 Best Actor
 Best Actress
 Best Playback Male
 Best Playback Female
 Best Music Director
 Best Director
 Best Song
 Best Actor in a Negative Role

Critics choice

 Best Film
 Best Actor
 Best Actress
 Best Supporting Actor
 Best Supporting Actress
 Best Director

Jury's choice

 Best Actor
 Best Actress
 Trendsetting Performance of the Year - Male
 Trendsetting Performance of the Year - Female
 Best Film
 Best Director
 Best Supporting Actor
 Best Supporting Actress
 Best Actor in a Negative Role
 Most Promising Talent (Tapash Pal Memorial Award)
 New Age Woman of The Year
 Best Music Director
 Song of the Year
 Diva of the Decade – (Supriya Devi Memorial Award)
 Best Screenplay
 Best Cinematographer
 Best Playback
 Best Actor in a Comic Role
 Best Lyrics
 Best Production Designer 
 Best Make Up 
 Best Sound Designer 
 Best Editor
 OTT Promising Face 
 Hotshot Director of the Year
 Most Distinguished Performance in a Character Role

References

External links
 Official website

Awards established in 2020

Films and Frames Digital Film Awards